Nothing Personal or Nothin' Personal may refer to:

Film and TV
 Nothing Personal (1980 film), starring Donald Sutherland
 Nothing Personal (1995 film), by Thaddeus O'Sullivan 
 Nothing Personal (2007 film), a Russian film
 Nothing Personal (2009 film), by Urszula Antoniak
 Nothing Personal (TV series), a true-crime documentary television series hosted by Steven Schirripa
 "Nothing Personal" (Agents of S.H.I.E.L.D.), a 2014 episode of Agents of S.H.I.E.L.D.

Literature
 Nothing Personal (play), a 2011 play David Williamson
 "Nothing Personal", a one-act play in Hugh Leonard's trilogy Suburb of Babylon

Music

Albums
 Nothing Personal (Delbert McClinton album), 2001
 Nothing Personal (All Time Low album), 2009
 Nothing Personal, a 1958 album by George Melly
 Nothin Personal, a 2016 album by Cozz

Songs
 "Nothing Personal", a composition by Don Grolnick featured on the album Michael Brecker (1987)
 "Nothin' Personal", a 2002 song by The Rowan Brothers from Crazy People
 "Nothin' Personal", a 1998 song by the Dust Junkys